Latoia albicosta, also known as white edged latoia, is a moth in the genus Latoia in the family Limacodidae.

Distribution 
Latoia albicosta occurs in the Democratic Republic of the Congo, Kenya, Malawi, Mozambique, South Africa, Tanzania, Uganda, Zambia and Zimbabwe.

Larval foodplants 

The larval foodplant  of L. albicosta is Celtis.

References

Taxa named by George Hampson
Moths described in 1910
Insects of Kenya
Insects of Malawi
Insects of Mozambique
Insects of South Africa
Insects of Tanzania
Insects of Uganda
Insects of Zambia
Insects of Zimbabwe
Insects of the Democratic Republic of the Congo
Limacodidae